Elena Anguissola (c. 1532 – 1584) was an Italian painter and nun. She was the sister of the better-known painter Sofonisba (or Sophonisba) Anguissola.

Biography 
Elena Anguissola (who became a nun with the name of Sister Minerva) was the daughter of Amilcare Anguissola and Bianca Ponzoni. The spelling of the surname, in sixteenth century documents, varies between Angosciola and Angussola.

Her parents were of noble origins. Her father belonged to the Genoese nobility and had moved to Lombardy. With his family, Amilcare Anguissola lived in Cremona, in a building on Via Pellegrino Tibaldi. He taught all of his children a humanistic culture, with readings of Latin and Italian texts, and painting for the eldest daughters Elena and Sofonisba, under the guidance of Bernardino Campi (1522–1591). They lived for three years in the house of Campi and in 1546, when the painter left Cremona and moved to Milan, Sofonisba Anguissola became the painting teacher of her younger sisters. This is the first case documented in Italy of girls sent to live at the home of a painter to accommodate their inclination towards art, as well as the first Italian family with painter sisters.

In 1550 Elena and Sofonisba (the older sisters) passed into the workshop of Bernardino Gatti, called the Sojaro. They specialized in portraiture and also took inspiration from the art of Moretto da Brescia and the mannerism of the Spanish portrait. The two sisters went to Mantua, where they were received at the Gonzaga court. In 1566 Giorgio Vasari arrived in Cremona and, as a guest in the Anguissola house, marveled at the art of the sisters. Elena retired to the convent of San Vincenzo in Mantua as a Dominican nun, taking the name of Sister Minerva (not to be confused with her younger sister called Minerva). Her name is mentioned in a letter of 1557, written by her father to the Duchess of Mantua and in her brother's will, dated 1575. Perhaps it is her Portrait of the Dominican as Saint Catherine of Siena - it could be her self-portrait - kept in the Galleria Borghese in Rome.

Portraits and interiors, Anguissola family 
The alleged portrait of Minerva Anguissola (or self-portrait of Sofonisba)  was painted by Sofonisba Anguissola. The young Minerva is forced into a dress of heavy brocade, of a dark brown color, trimmed with fur and lined with natural-colored silk; she wears a precious white shirt, edged with lace and raised in a Venetian style, and has a veil of micro pearls around her neck. The painter lingers on the details: the folds of the dress, the light of the lace, the complex braid hairstyle. Feature of Sofonisba is the depth of the eyes, with slightly dilated pupils.

We know another portrait, also this work by Sofonisba.  It represents a young woman, adorned with jewels of gold and coral, with her hands resting on a sleeve. It is believed to be her younger sister Minerva.

Chess game depicts Lucia (left), Minerva as a teenager (right) and her little sister Europa; on the bottom you can see the nanny, whose discreet presence, together with the open and childish smile of Europa - a discreet touch of humor that contrasts with the chess attention of the older sisters - makes the scene intimate, full of family affections. The two girls play «a battle between amazons, a competition that alludes to the search for and the conquest of a female primacy, of an excellence able to compete, at least on the cultural and intellectual level, with the male one. [...] True Amazons and queens appear the Anguissola sisters, adequately dressed for the occasion and reaching out for a victory that identifies with the goal of a life spent in the study and virtuous occupations ».  On the bottom there is a bluish, Flemish-style landscape .

Amilcare Anguissola with his children Minerva and Asdrubale by Sofonisba Anguissola  is another Anguissola family intern . Minerva with one hand raises a hem of her dress, of heavy blue brocade, and with the other she holds a bunch of flowers. The father's attention is entirely for the male child, second-born, who holds his arm in protection. A little dog completes the scene. In the background opens a pleasant landscape, tinged with light blue, of clear Nordic influence.

Portrait of a nun by Sofonisba Anguissola, signed and dated,  perhaps is a portrait of her sister Elena, in the guise of Sister Minerva. The novice nun holds a book in her hand, lined with red leather and with gold friezes.

Children of Amilcare Anguissola and Bianca Ponzoni 
The reference text, for this list, is the catalog published in 1994 by Leonardo Arte which was an opportunity to review ancient, well-known documents and to compare them with other unpublished documents. The fundamental dates are:
 1530, date of the parents' marriage
 1551 year of birth of Amilcare and the chronological succession of births of children.

Not only were contemporary documents studied, but also the apparent age of the Anguissola family members, in the paintings of Sofonisba. The other dates of birth, in the cited catalog, are expressed in the form of a fork, in two or three years. However, in order to respect the chronological succession of the births of the children, we have opted in some cases for an intermediate dating, inside the fork. The names are not surprising because, except for Lucia and Elena who were the names of the grandmothers, at Anguissola the names were taken from mythology or ancient history. No reference was found for Anna Maria.
 Sofonisba (1535-1625), painter, married first Fabrizio Moncada and secondly Orazio Lomellini.
 Elena (1536-post 1585), painter, enters the convent with the name Sister Minerva.
 Lucia (1537-1565), painter.
 Minerva (1539-1566), teacher, not painter, but excellent in Latin and Italian letters.
 Europa (1542 (or 1543) -?), painter, married Carlo Schinchinelli.
 Asdrubale (1551-1623), musician.
 Anna Maria (1555-1611), painter and teacher, married Giacomo di Gaspare Sommi in 1574.

Bibliography 
 Catalog of the exhibition held in Cremona in 1994, in Vienna and in Washington in 1995.

1530s births
1584 deaths
Painters from Cremona
16th-century Italian painters
Italian Renaissance painters
Italian women painters
16th-century Italian women artists
Sibling artists
Sofonisba Anguissola